Protestants are about 2,009,374 in Sudan (5% of the population). 
They are forbidden to proselytize. 
The law makes apostasy (which includes conversion from Islam to another religion) punishable by death. 
The southern ethnic groups fighting the civil war largely are followers of traditional indigenous religions or Christians.

Denominations
Africa Inland Church
Assemblies of God
Church of Christ in the Upper Nile
Sudan Evangelical Presbyterian Church
Presbyterian Church in Sudan
Sudan Interior Church
Sudanese Church of Christ
Sudan Pentecostal Church

See also
New Sudan Council of Churches
Episcopal Church of the Sudan

Sources
Protestantism by country article
World Christian Encyclopedia, 2001 edition, Volume 1, page 703 (List of denominations)
Status of religious freedom in Sudan article

 
Sudan